Cosme San Martín Lagunas (27 September 1849/1850, Valparaíso – 1 April 1906, Santiago) was a Chilean painter and the first Chilean-born Director of the Academy of Painting (Santiago, Chile).

Biography 
His father was a musician. In 1864, he went to Santiago to study at the Academia. His teachers included the school's Director, Alejandro Ciccarelli and Juan Mochi, who had a great influence on his style. Four years later, no older than nineteen, San Martín was named a Professor of drawing at the Academy.

His work "Jesús y María Magdalena" won a competition that enabled him to obtain a grant for study in Europe. In 1875, he went to Paris, where he studied at the École des Beaux-Arts and worked in the studios of the Spanish painter, Juan Antonio González (1842-1914), along with his fellow Chilean, Pedro Lira. He participated in several exhibitions as well as the Salon. In 1880, his painting "El reposo de la modelo" (The Model's Rest) was highly praised and was included in the Salon's promotional material.

He remained in Europe for ten years. Upon his return to Chile, he was named Deputy Director of the Academy under his former teacher, Juan Mochi. Two years later, when Mochi resigned, San Martín succeeded him as Director. He was very dedicated and well-liked, and apparently continued to act in that capacity until 1900, even though Pedro Lira had technically been appointed to succeed him in 1893. Lira was replaced by the sculptor Virginio Arias.

He was one of the last representatives of Academicism in his country and worked in a wide variety of genres, including portraits, history painting, interior portraits, allegories, marine art and still-lifes. He was also a musician, and often played viola with the orchestra at the Municipal Theater of Santiago, where his father had been employed.

Selected paintings

References

External links

 The full caricature by Rojas @ Memoria Chilena.

19th-century births
1906 deaths
Chilean male painters
Portrait painters
Genre painters
People from Valparaíso
19th-century Chilean painters
19th-century Chilean male artists
Chilean male artists
20th-century Chilean painters
Male painters
20th-century Chilean male artists
Academic staff of the Academy of Painting (Santiago, Chile)